Revaz Mikheilis dze Dzodzuashvili (born 15 April 1945) is a Georgian football manager and a former player. He coaches FC Dinamo Sukhumi. He earned 49 caps for the USSR national football team, and participated in the 1970 FIFA World Cup and UEFA Euro 1972. After the UEFA Euro 1972 along with his teammates by Soviet Union national football team – Murtaz Khurtsilava and Evgeni Rudakov – he was named by UEFA in the official Team of the Tournament, where also were presented such great players like Franz Beckenbauer, Gerd Müller, Paul Breitner, Uli Hoeness and Günter Netzer.

After retiring from competitions he became a football manager, including a stint as head coach of the Latvia national football team.
He was a manager of FC Shakhter Karagandy at the start of 2008 season, but his contract was terminated soon.

Personal life 
Dzoduashvili's son, Mikheil Dzodzuashvili, is married to Georgian singer Sopho Khalvashi. Together they have two daughters.

International career
Dzodzuashvili was capped 49 times for Soviet Union national football team, made his debut against Colombia in international friendly match, which was held on Estadio Nemesio Camacho El Campín in Bogota 20 February 1969.

Career statistics

Honours

Player
Dinamo Tbilisi
 Soviet Top League third place: 1969, 1971, 1972, 1976 
 Soviet Cup runner-up: 1970

Soviet Union
 Football at the 1972 Summer Olympics third place: 1972
 UEFA European Football Championship runner-up: 1972

Individual
UEFA European Championship Team of the Tournament: 1972

Manager
Dinamo Tbilisi 
Georgian Umaglesi Liga: 1991–92 

Torpedo Kutaisi
Georgian Umaglesi Liga: 2001–02

Olimpi Rustavi
Georgian Umaglesi Liga: 2006–07

References

External links

 
 
 
 Revaz Dzodzuashvili at rusteam.permian.ru

1945 births
Living people
Sportspeople from Kutaisi
Footballers from Georgia (country)
Soviet footballers
Soviet Union international footballers
Soviet Top League players
FC Torpedo Kutaisi players
FC Dinamo Tbilisi players
1970 FIFA World Cup players
UEFA Euro 1972 players
Olympic footballers of the Soviet Union
Footballers at the 1972 Summer Olympics
Olympic bronze medalists for the Soviet Union
Olympic medalists in football
Medalists at the 1972 Summer Olympics
Association football defenders
Soviet football managers
Football managers from Georgia (country)
Expatriate football managers in Ukraine
Expatriate sportspeople from Georgia (country) in Ukraine
Expatriate football managers in Latvia
Expatriate football managers in Russia
Expatriate football managers in Kazakhstan
Expatriate football managers in Azerbaijan
Russian Premier League managers
Ukrainian Premier League managers
FC Torpedo Kutaisi managers
FC Dinamo Tbilisi managers
FC Metalurgi Rustavi managers
FC Temp Shepetivka managers
Latvia national football team managers
FC Lokomotivi Tbilisi managers
Ittihad FC managers
Georgia national football team managers
FC Elista managers
FC Spartak Vladikavkaz managers
FC Shakhter Karagandy managers
Turan-Tovuz IK managers